The Panther Rio was a motor car made by British manufacturer Panther Westwinds, using Triumph Dolomite mechanicals. According to the company, it differed from the family saloon-class Dolomite, in being finished to "Rolls-Royce standards". Only 38 were built between 1975 and 1977. A rarer Rio Especial used the high-performance Triumph Dolomite Sprint as its basis.

Panther Westwinds had been established by fashion designer Robert Jankel to produce expensive and bespoke cars for the customer that wanted something entirely different. Such vehicles held a lucrative market at the time. Jankel began working on a car that would appeal to the Rolls-Royce owner looking to trade down to something more economic, yet still considered higher class — losing nothing in terms of luxury or build quality. Following the 1973 energy crisis, demand for cars with high fuel consumption began to diminish.

The Triumph Dolomite was selected for improvement, due in part to the vehicle's combination of advanced engines and upright driving position, which offered a blend of modern and traditional luxuries. The Panther Rio was the result, and was launched in September 1975.

When released the car had leather and walnut internal fittings and a hand-beaten aluminium skin. The Rio was advertised as:"Combining characteristics combined in no other single car — the very highest level of luxury, appointments and smooth quietness with superb handling, a  maximum speed, 0–60 mph acceleration in 8.7 seconds, the opulence of Connolly Leather, deep pile carpeting and burr walnut in the finest limousine traditions with the fuel economy and manoeuvrability of a compact family saloon; Panther coachbuilt quality and safety engineering with total functionalism; hand-crafted exclusivity without ostentation." The compact family saloon was offered in two forms: the 1850 cc version, which was the "base" model; and the 2.0 litre 16-valve version (using the engine from the Dolomite Sprint), called the Rio Especial. Problems for the Rio included the fact that the new thicker, fatter seats resulted in a more cramped interior than the Dolomite.

Panther was optimistic over the car's chances and prematurely announced a pre-order of 100 cars from the H.R.Owen luxury line of dealerships. This would have meant a financial boom, clearing the way for the Rio to be offered for sale amongst some of the highest quality vehicles of the time. However, the 100 car deal never materialized and the Rio sold at extremely slow rates, largely in part to customer awareness of the Rio's relatively humble Triumph Dolomite underpinnings.

The price was high too. In February 1976, a Rio Especial cost £9,445. In comparison, the Dolomite Sprint sold for £3,283 and the Jaguar XJ 5.3 for £7,496. The latter advertised luxury to equal the Rio's.

References

Rio
Luxury vehicles
Sedans
1970s cars
Cars introduced in 1975